The Imam Husayn Shrine is the mosque and burial site of Husayn ibn Ali, the third Imam of Shia Islam, in the city of Karbala, Iraq. It stands on the site of the Mausoleum of Husayn, who was a grandson of Muhammad, near the place where he embraced martyrdom during the Battle of Karbala in 680 CE The tomb of Husayn is one of the holiest sites in Shia Islam, outside of Mecca and Medina, and many make pilgrimages to the site. Every year, millions of pilgrims visit the city to observe Ashura, which marks the commemoration of Husayn's death for all Muslims.

Description
The boundary wall of the shrine surrounds wooden gates covered with glass decorations. The gates open into a courtyard separated into smaller rooms or precincts with many "Iwans" along the walls. The grave of Husayn is enclosed within a metal-mesh like structure, found directly beneath the golden dome. On 5 March 2013 the process of replacing the zarih (metal mesh like structure) over the tomb of Husayn was completed and the new zarih inaugurated. Al Abbas Mosque is located nearby. Plans to replace the shrine's historic dome with a modern steel framed one, have been met with controversy especially by historic preservationists as it would severely distort the shrine's historic integrity and character.

Burials

On the right hand side of the entrance is the tomb of Habīb ibn Madhahir al-Asadī (حبیب ابن مظاہر الاسدی), a friend and companion of Husayn since their childhood and a casualty of the Battle of Karbala.

Within the shrine of Husayn can also be found a grave of all the 72 martyrs of Karbalā’. They were buried in a mass grave which was then covered with soil to the ground level. This mass grave is at the foot of Husayn's grave. As well, beside Husayn's grave are the graves of his two sons: ‘Alī al-Akbar and the six-month old, ‘Alī al-Asghar.

History

Husayn bought a piece of land after his arrival at Karbala’ from Bani Asad. He and his Ahl al-Bayt are buried in that portion, known as (الحائر), where the Shrines are presently located. The history of destruction and reconstruction of the Shrines of Karbala’ is long. Both the Shrines were greatly extended by successive Muslim rulers, but suffered repeated destruction from attacking armies. Several rulers extended, decorated and kept the Shrines and its precincts in good condition. Among them is Fath-Ali Shah Qajar, who in 1250 AH ordered the construction of two Shrines, one over Husayn's grave and the other over the grave of his half-brother, Abbas ibn Ali. 

From the time of Husayn ibn Ali's death in 680, pilgrimages to commemorate the massacre have often been repressed. Despite many attempts by successive rulers, such as Al-Rashīd and Al-Mutawakkil, to put a restriction on the development of the area, it has nonetheless evolved into a city.

The historian Ibn Kuluwayh mentioned that those who buried Husayn ibn ‘Alī constructed a special, durable identifying marker for the gravesite.

Larger, more significant construction on the gravesite began during the rule of al-Saffah (reign: 750–754 AD), the first caliph of the long-lasting Abbasid caliphate (an Islamic dynasty). However, heavy restrictions were put in place to prevent people from visiting the grave during the rule of Hārūn al-Rashīd, the fifth Abbasid caliph (reign: 786–809 AD).

During the rule of al-Mā'mūn, the seventh Abbasid caliph (reign: 813–833 AD), gravesite construction resumed until the year 850 AD, when al-Mutawakkil ordered the destruction of the grave and the filling of the resulting pit with water. His son who succeeded him as caliph, al-Muntasir, allowed people to visit the gravesite, and since then building the precinct to the grave increased and developed step by step.

On the other hand, the historian Ibn al-Athir, stated that in the year 981 AD (371 AH), ‘Adhud ad-Dawlah became the first to expansively lay the foundations for large-scale construction and to generously decorate the place. He also built houses and markets around the precinct, and surrounded Karbalā with a high boundary wall, turning it into a strong castle.

In the year 407 AH (1016 AD), the precinct caught fire due to the dropping of two large candles on the wooden decorations. The state minister at the time, Hasan ibn Fadl, rebuilt the damaged sections.

Timeline
The following events are in chronological order, stating instances that widely involved the shrine, impressing its construction, renovation and series of extremist activities that reduced its structure and killed pilgrims from time to time.

See also

Arba'een
Al-Abbas Mosque
Bab al-Saghir
Al Hussein Mosque, Cairo
Mashhad Al Husayn, Ashkelon
Holiest sites in Shia Islam
Jannat al-Baqi'
Jannat al-Mu'alla

Notes

References
Aghaie, Kamran Scot (2004). The Martyrs of Karbala: Shi'i Symbols and Rituals in Modern Iran. University of Washington Press. 
Litvak, Meir (1998). Shi'i Scholars of Nineteenth-Century Iraq: The Ulama of Najaf and Karbala. Cambridge University Press. 
al Musawi, Muhsin (2006). Reading Iraq: Culture and Power and Conflict. I.B.Tauris. 
Shimoni, Yaacov & Levine, Evyatar (1974). Political Dictionary of the Middle East in the 20th Century. Quadrangle/New York Times Book Co.

External links

In pictures: Pilgrims in Karbala - BBC News Online.
Shia Shrines of Karbala - Sacred Destinations

Shia shrines
Shia mosques in Iraq
7th-century mosques
Dawoodi Bohras
Buildings and structures in Karbala
Safavid architecture
Shrines in Iraq
Karbala